Rico is a diminutive of the either Spanish masculine given name Federico or Ricardo and Italian given name Enrico, nickname and a surname. Notable people with the name include:

Given name
 Rico Abreu (born 1992), American car race driver
 Rico Alaniz (1919–2015), Mexican-American actor
 Rico E. Anderson (born 1968), American film actor
 Rico Back (born 1954), Swiss-domiciled German businessman
 Rico Barrera (born 1984), Filipino actor
 Rico Beats, American record executive
 Rico Bell, British based artist and musician
 Rico Benatelli (born 1992), German footballer
 Rico Bianchi (born 1930), Swiss rower
 Rico Blanco (born 1973), Filipino singer-songwriter
 Rico Brizuela (born 1946), Filipino businessman
 Rico Brogna (born 1970), American professional baseball player
 Rico Capuano, better known as Rico (Scottish singer), Scottish musician
 Rico Carty (born 1939), Dominican professional baseball player
 Rico Chiapparelli, American wrestler
 Rico Conning, British songwriter
 Rico Constantino (born 1961), American wrestler
 Rico Daniels (born 1962), English television presenter
 Rico Dowdle (born 1998), American football player
 Rico Elmer (born 1969), Swiss ski mountaineer
 Rico Engler (born 1987), German footballer
 Rico Fata (born 1980), Canadian ice hockey player
 Rico Freiermuth (born 1958), Swedish bobsledder
 Rico Freimuth (born 1988), German athlete
 Rico Gafford (born 1996), American football player
 Rico Gagliano, American journalist
 Rico Garcia (born 1994), American baseball player
 Rico Gathers (born 1994), American football player
 Rico Gear (born 1978), New Zealand rugby union player
 Rico Glagla (born 1974), German athlete
 Rico Harris (born 1977), American basketball player
 Rico Henry (born 1997), English professional footballer
 Rico Hill (born 1977), American basketball player
 Rico Hines (born 1978), American basketball coach
 Rico Hizon (born 1966), Filipino broadcaster
 Rico Hoye (born 1974), American boxer
 Rico Krahnert, German figure skater
 Rico Kühne (born 1982), German footballer
 Rico Lebrun (1900-1964), American-Italian painter
 Rico Lieder (born 1971), German sprinter
 Rico Lins (born 1955), Brazilian graphic designer
 Rico Love (born 1982), American singer-songwriter
 Rico Mack (born 1971), American football player
 Rico Maierhofer (born 1985), Filipino basketball player
 Rico Malvar (born 1957), Brazilian engineer
 Rico Mascariñas (born 1953), Filipino chess player
 Rico McCoy (born 1987), American football player
 Rico Meinel (born 1974), German ski jumper
 Rico Morack (born 1988), German footballer
 Rico Murray (born 1988), American football defensive back
 Rico Noel (born 1989), American professional baseball outfielder
 Rico Oller (born 1958), American politician
 Rico Peter (born 1983), Swiss bobsledder
 Rico Petrocelli (born 1943), American former baseball manager
 Rico Pontvianne (1943-2018), Mexican basketball player
 Rico Preißinger (born 1996), German professional footballer
 Rico Puestel (born 1986), German record producer
 Rico Puhlmann (1934-1996), German fashion photographer
 Rico E. Puno, Filipino technocrat
 Rico J. Puno (1953-2018), Filipino singer
 Rico Ramos (born 1987), American boxer
 Rico Reese (born 1983), American professional football player
 Rico Rex (born 1976), German former figure skater
 Rico Richardson (born 1991), American football player
 Rico Robles (born 1980), Filipino disc jockey
 Rico Rodriguez (actor) (born 1998), American actor
 Rico Rodriguez (musician) (1934–2015), Jamaican ska and reggae trombonist
 Rico Rogers (born 1978), New Zealand cyclist
 Rico Roman (born 1981), American ice hockey player
 Rico Rossi (born 1965), Italian ice hockey player
 Rico Rossi (musician), American hip-hop artist
 Rico Rossy (born 1964), American professional baseball player
 Rico Saccani (born 1952), American conductor
 Rico Schmider (born 1991), German footballer
 Rico Schmitt (born 1968), German footballer
 Rico Seith (born 1994), German singer
 Rico Smith (born 1969), American former football player
 Rico Steinmann (born 1967), German professional footballer
 Rico Strieder (born 1992), German football midfielder
 Rico Suave (wrestler) (born 1970), Puerto Rican professional wrestler
 Rico Tampatty (born 1964), Indonesian actor
 Rico Tan (born 1978), Canadian boxer
 Rico Tice (born 1966), Spanish-Anglican writer
 Rico Tomaso (1898-1985), American illustrator
 Rico Verhoeven (born 1989), Dutch kickboxer
 Rico Villasenor, American musician
 Rico Vonck (born 1987), Dutch former darts player
 Rico Washington (born 1978), American professional baseball player
 Rico Wolven (born 1990), Dutch footballer
 Rico Yan (1975-2002), Filipino matinee idol
 Rico Zeegers (born 2000), Dutch footballer
 Rico Zuccaro (born 1942), American professional baseball umpire
 Rico Zulkarnain (born 1989), Welsh football player

Surname
 Antonio Rico (1908–1988), Spanish chess player
 Art Rico (1895–1919), American baseball catcher
 Efraím Rico (born 1967), Colombian road cyclist
 Fred Rico (born 1944), American baseball player
 Isidro Rico (born 1961), Mexican marathon runner
 Loly Rico (21st century), Salvadoran-Canadian activist
 Sergio Rico (born 1993), Spanish footballer

Fictional characters
 Caesar Enrico "Rico" Bandelle, the title character from the 1931 movie Little Caesar
 Juan Rico, a character from Starship Troopers, renamed John Rico for the movie
 Rico, a character in the 2004 animated film Home on the Range
 Rico Banderas, a character in the videogame Xenogears
 Rico Dredd, a character from the comic Judge Dredd
 Judge Rico, a different character from Judge Dredd
 Rico (Gunslinger Girl), a character in the anime Gunslinger Girl
 Rico (NX Files), a character in the webseries NX Files
 Rico Suave (character), in the Disney TV series Hannah Montana
 Rico (Madagascar), a penguin character from the animated Madagascar franchise
 Rico, a character in the 2002 crime drama film Paid in Full, based on real-life former drug dealer Alpo Martinez
 Ricardo Tubbs, a police detective in the TV series and film Miami Vice
 Rico Brzenska, a character from the manga and anime "Shingeki no Kyojin" (Attack on Titan). Female.
 Rico Rodriguez, the main protagonist of the video game series Just Cause.

See also
Riko, given name

Masculine given names
Lists of people by nickname